This is a list of notable individuals born in the Netherlands, including the overseas constituent countries of Aruba, Curaçao, and Sint Maarten and the now defunct Netherlands Antilles (Bonaire, Saba and Sint Eustatius), of Lebanese ancestry or people of Lebanese and Dutch dual nationality who live or lived in the Netherlands.

Politicians
 Abdul Nasser El Hakim - Curaçaoan businessman, politician and Minister of Economic Affairs
 Emily de Jongh-Elhage - former Prime Minister of the Netherlands Antilles

See also
List of Lebanese people
List of Lebanese people (Diaspora)

References

Netherlands
Lebanese people in the Netherlands

Lebanese